John Robert Beveridge (8 May 1907 – 30 June 1986) was an Australian rules footballer who represented  in the Victorian Football League (VFL) and West Perth in the Western Australian National Football League (WANFL).

Family
The son of Paul Robert Beveridge (1876–1943) and Catherine Mary Beveridge (1875–1961), née Prendeville, John Robert Beveridge was born at Collingwood, Victoria on 8 May 1907.

He married Mercia Griffiths Payne (1907–1986) in 1936.

Beveridge's grandson, Luke Beveridge, also played football at VFL/AFL level and currently coaches the Western Bulldogs who he coached to the 2016 AFL premiership.

Football
Beveridge played as a centreman and was noted for his handballing skills. He finished equal seventh in the 1933 Brownlow Medal and was a member of the Collingwood side which won four premierships in a row under Jock McHale.

After leaving Collingwood he joined West Perth in the WANFL and helped them to win their second consecutive premiership.

In 1937 he moved to Tasmania and was captain-coach of Launceston, the club winning the NTFA premiership for the fifth consecutive season and also the State premiership for that season.

Death
He died at the Moorabbin Hospital in Bentleigh East, Victoria on 30 June 1986.

Notes

External links
 
 
 
 Jack Beveridge at Colingwood Forever.

1907 births
1986 deaths
Australian rules footballers from Melbourne
Players of Australian handball
Collingwood Football Club players
Collingwood Football Club Premiership players
West Perth Football Club players
Launceston Football Club players
Launceston Football Club coaches
Horsham Football Club players
Four-time VFL/AFL Premiership players
People from Collingwood, Victoria